Muhammad Sarwar (born 12 May 1975) is a Pakistani former field hockey player who was active from 1995 to 2002, and played as a striker in 180 games over the course of his international career, scoring 44 goals. Sarwar played in the Premier Hockey League and represented Pakistan in the 1996 Summer Olympics, and again in the 2000 Summer Olympics, and in several Hockey World Cup tournaments. In 2002, he was on the bronze medal-winning team in the Commonwealth Games.

References

External links
 

Pakistani male field hockey players
Male field hockey forwards
1975 births
Field hockey players at the 1996 Summer Olympics
Field hockey players at the 2000 Summer Olympics
2002 Men's Hockey World Cup players
Olympic field hockey players of Pakistan
Place of birth missing (living people)
Living people
Asian Games medalists in field hockey
Asian Games bronze medalists for Pakistan
Field hockey players at the 1998 Asian Games
Medalists at the 1998 Asian Games
Commonwealth Games medallists in field hockey
Commonwealth Games bronze medallists for Pakistan
Field hockey players at the 2002 Commonwealth Games
Medallists at the 2002 Commonwealth Games